Gerald Tagliabue (15 September 1935 – 20 April 2016) was an Australian rules footballer who played with South Melbourne in the Victorian Football League (VFL).

Notes

External links 

2016 deaths
1935 births
Australian rules footballers from Victoria (Australia)
Sydney Swans players